Les Maîtres (The Masters) is the sixth volume in Georges Duhamel's Chronique des Pasquier. It tells the story of Laurent Pasquier, a research student who is working for two rival academics, professors Chalgrin and Rohner. Gradually, Laurent sees that the admiration with which his masters discuss each other is a thin veil over a bitter rivalry, which one day erupts with disastrous consequences for all concerned.

Publication
Paris, A. Fayard [1937] (1st edition)

1937 French novels